The Roman Catholic Diocese of Hualien (Lat: Dioecesis Hvalienensis) is a diocese of the Latin Church of the  Roman Catholic Church in Taiwan.

Erected as the Apostolic Prefecture of Hualien in 1952, the prefecture was elevated to a full diocese, in 1963. The diocese is suffragan to the Archdiocese of Taipei.

The current bishop is Philip Huang Chao-ming, appointed in November 2001.

Statistics 
Catholics are 10.3% (56,401) of the total population (548,870).

Ordinaries
Matthew Kia Yen-wen (14 Dec 1974 appointed – 15 Nov 1978 appointed, Archbishop of Taipei) 
Paul Shan Kuo-hsi, S.J. (15 Nov 1979 appointed – 4 Mar 1991 appointed, Bishop of Kaohsiung) 
Andrew Tsien Chih-ch'un (23 Jan 1992 appointed – 19 Nov 2001 retired) 
Philip Huang Chao-ming (19 Nov 2001 appointed – )

See also

Catholic Church in Taiwan

References
Catholic Hierarchy
GCatholic

Hualien
Roman Catholic dioceses and prelatures established in the 20th century
Christian organizations established in 1952
1952 establishments in Taiwan
Hualien County